Karaoke Superstars is the first major release album by the Christian rock band Superchic[k]. Before being signed to Inpop Records, the album was released independently. It did not include the three final remix tracks and featured different cover art. "One Girl Revolution" has been featured in several films, including Cadet Kelly, and Legally Blonde.  "Barlow Girls" is a tribute to fellow CCM peers BarlowGirl.

Track listing
 "Barlow Girls"
 "Big Star Machine"
 "Karaoke Superstars"
 "Get Up"
 "Not Done Yet"
 "Super Trouper"
 "TV Land"
 "Help Me Out God"
 "One Girl Revolution"
 "Alright"
 "Let It Be"
 "Help Me Out God (Dropped Chevy Mix)"
 "Alright (Respect to the Old Skool Mix)" (featuring Rex Carroll of Whitecross)
 "One Girl Revolution (Mob-Action Mix)"

The music video for "Barlow Girls" features Superchick at a high school. The video was presented in the 1.3:1 aspect ratio, which was very common for home video at that time. Members are either near the ticket booth, inside the ladies' washroom while a girl puts on makeup or playing on stage in the auditorium.

The Space Monkey Lab Remix of "Barlow Girls" was later released on Superchick's remix album, Regeneration.

References

Superchick albums
2001 debut albums
Inpop Records albums